Chatus may refer to: 
Chah Tus, village in Iran
Chatus (wine grape), wine grape variety from France